Lone Justice is the self-titled debut studio album by American roots rock band Lone Justice, released in April 1985.

Reception 

The album received some critical acclaim, but it failed commercially. Trouser Press described the problem as over-promotion: "It isn't that Lone Justice's first album is bad (it's not), but the ballyhoo that preceded the LA quartet's debut raised expectations that these frisky countryfied rock tunes (Linda Ronstadt on speed, perhaps, or Dolly Parton backed by the Blasters) couldn't possibly satisfy. Maria McKee is an impressive young singer — an energetic, throaty powerhouse with a Southern twang and a slight Patsy Cline catch — and the band is solid enough, but... [the album] doesn't come anywhere near extraordinary."

Track listing
Writing credits adapted from the album's liner notes.

Charts

Personnel
Adapted from the album's liner notes.

Lone Justice
Maria McKee – vocals, guitar, harmonica
Marvin Etzioni – bass guitar, background vocals
Ryan Hedgecock – guitar, acoustic guitar [1, 7], background vocals
Don Heffington – drums

Additional personnel
Benmont Tench – piano, organ, background vocals [1, 8]
 Bobbye Hall – percussion overdubs
Mike Campbell – guitar [3]
Bob Glaub – bass guitar [3] 
Little Steven – rhythm and lead guitar [6] 
Tony Gilkyson – guitar [7]

Production
 Jimmy Iovine – producer
 Shelly Yakus – engineer, mixing, overdub engineer
 Joe Chiccarelli – engineer, overdub engineer
 Greg Edward – engineer, mixing, overdub engineer
 Thom Panunzio – engineer, overdub engineer
 Gabe Veltri – overdub engineer
 Bruce Lampcov – assistant engineer
 Steve Shelton – assistant engineer
 Steve Hirsch – assistant engineer
 Greg Droman – assistant engineer
 Steve Strassman – assistant engineer
 Bill Jackson – assistant engineer
 Don Smith – mixing, overdub engineer
 Dave Thoener – mixing
 Stephen Marcussen – mastering
 Carlyne Majer – management
 Janet Weber – production coordination
 Chuck Reed – crew
 Deborah Turbeville – photography
 Paula Greif – art direction
 Jeffrey Kent Ayeroff – art direction
 Jeri McManus – design
 Julien – hair
 Michel Voyski – make-up
 Barbara Dente – stylist

Notes 

Lone Justice albums
1985 debut albums
Albums produced by Jimmy Iovine
Geffen Records albums